Rauf Mamedov (born 26 April 1988) is an Azerbaijani chess grandmaster and a three-time national champion. He competed in the FIDE World Cup in 2007, 2009, 2011 and 2015.

Career
Born in Baku, Mamedov started playing chess at the age of seven. In 2004, he won the Under 14 section of the European Youth Chess Championships. In the same year he became a Grandmaster (GM), following his victory of the Dubai Open. Mamedov won the Azerbaijani championship in 2006, 2008 and 2015. He competed in the FIDE World Cup in 2007, 2009, 2011 and 2015.

In 2009, he tied for 1st-3rd with Yuriy Kuzubov and Dmitry Andreikin in the category 16 SPICE Cup tournament at Lubbock, Texas. Mamedov won the Corsica Masters blitz tournament in 2011. In 2015 Mamedov won the European Blitz Chess Championship in Minsk. In 2016, he won the men's blitz chess event of the IMSA Elite Mind Games in Huai'an, China.

In February 2018, he participated in the Aeroflot Open. He finished tenth out of ninety-two, scoring 6/9 (+5–2=2).

In April 2018, he participated in the fifth edition of Shamkir Chess, finishing ninth with a score of 4/9 (+0–1=8).

Team competitions
He played in the gold medal-winning Azerbaijani team at the European Team Chess Championship in 2009, 2013 and 2017. He produced the best board 4 performance of the tournament in 2017, scoring 8/9 for a 2920 .

Personal life
Rauf Mamedov is married to Ukrainian international master Nataliya Buksa.

Gallery

References

External links

 
 
 
 
 

1988 births
Living people
Chess grandmasters
Chess players from Baku
Chess Olympiad competitors